The Polish Social-Revolutionary Society was the first Polish anarchist organization, founded in 1872 in Zurich by Polish emigrants.

Program
The program spoke of a social revolution aimed at workers' control the means of production and replacing the state and capitalism with a system based on workers' associations and independent communes. The program, recognizing the "right to independence and national development", proclaimed the slogan "Long live a free, socialist and democratic Poland!" It also emphasized that "Poland exists only where the people recognize and want to be Polish, and it ends where this people, not wanting to belong to the Polish union, joins a free union of another nationality."

References

Bibliography

Polish revolutionary organisations
History of Switzerland
Anarchist organizations in Poland
Anarchism in Switzerland
Defunct anarchist organizations
Polish diaspora in Europe